The Dutch Eredivisie in the 1966–67 season was contested by 18 teams. The number of participants was brought up from 16, so there were more promoted, then relegated teams. AFC Ajax won the championship.

Teams

A total of 18 teams are taking part in the league.

League standings

Results

See also
 1966–67 Eerste Divisie
 1966–67 Tweede Divisie

References

 Eredivisie official website - info on all seasons 
 RSSSF

Eredivisie seasons
Netherlands
1966–67 in Dutch football